The men's 10 metre air pistol event at the 2008 Olympic Games took place on August 9 at the Beijing Shooting Range Hall, and was won by the reigning World champion, Pang Wei of the host country, who thus became the first male gold medal winner of the Beijing Olympics.

The event consisted of two rounds: a qualifier and a final. In the qualifier, each shooter fired 60 shots with an air pistol at 10 metres distance. Scores for each shot were in increments of 1, with a maximum score of 10.

The top 8 shooters in the qualifying round moved on to the final round. There, they fired an additional 10 shots. These shots scored in increments of .1, with a maximum score of 10.9. The total score from all 70 shots was used to determine final ranking.

Kim Jong-su of North Korea originally won the bronze medal, but was disqualified after he tested positive for propranolol, upgrading Turner from fourth to third place.

Records
The existing world and Olympic records were as follows.

Qualification round
The qualification round was held between 12:00 and 13:45 China Standard Time (UTC+8), with all shooters fitting into a single relay.

DQ Disqualified – Q Qualified for final

Final
The final was held at 15:00 China Standard Time (UTC+8).

DQ Disqualified

References

External links
Event Reports

Shooting at the 2008 Summer Olympics
Men's events at the 2008 Summer Olympics